Gorseinon Athletic A.F.C. are a Welsh football club from Gorseinon, in the City and County of Swansea in Wales. They currently play in the Carmarthenshire League Premier Division.

History

The club is one of the most successful teams in the league, having been champions of the top division nine times.

Honours

 Carmarthenshire League Premier Division (Tier 1 of Camrthenshire League)  - Champions (9): 1972–73; 1973–74; 1974–75; 1975–76; 1981–82; 1982–83; 1985–86; 1986–87; 1990–91 

 Carmarthenshire Senior Cup - Winners (8): 1968–69; 1972–73; 1975–76; 1983–84; 1984–85; 1985–86; 1986–87; 2017–18 

 West Wales Intermediate Cup – Runner-Up: 1974–75

References

External links
Official club website
Official club Twitter
Official club Facebook

Football clubs in Wales
Carmarthenshire League clubs
Swansea
Sport in Swansea
Football clubs in Swansea